Gabriela Huerta (born 28 April 1983) is a Mexican rower. She competed at the 2004 Summer Olympics and the 2008 Summer Olympics.

References

External links
 

1983 births
Living people
Mexican female rowers
Olympic rowers of Mexico
Rowers at the 2004 Summer Olympics
Rowers at the 2008 Summer Olympics
Rowers from Mexico City
Pan American Games medalists in rowing
Pan American Games bronze medalists for Mexico
Rowers at the 2003 Pan American Games